Adam Charles Peterson (born December 11, 1965) is an American former professional baseball pitcher.

Peterson is a 1984 graduate of Timpview High School.

In 1989 he led the Vancouver Canadians, who at that time were the Triple-A affiliates for the Chicago White Sox, to victory in the Triple-A World Series, pitching 25 games and going 14-5 for the season with a  2.27 ERA, earning MVP honors as a result.

References

External links

1965 births
Living people
American expatriate baseball players in Canada
Baseball players from Long Beach, California
Birmingham Barons players
Chicago White Sox players
Gulf Coast White Sox players
Las Vegas Stars (baseball) players
Major League Baseball pitchers
Niagara Falls Sox players
Peninsula White Sox players
San Diego Padres players
Vancouver Canadians players